is a former Japanese-Romanian hammer thrower and sports scientist. He has been among the world elite since the 2001 World Championships, where he won the silver medal. He was the 2004 Olympic champion. In 2011, he was crowned world champion.

Career
Murofushi was born in Numazu, Shizuoka Prefecture. Before the 2001 World Championships he had made his mark in Asian athletics. He started with a bronze medal at the 1993 East Asian Games. At the Asian Championships he won silver medals in 1993, 1995. He won the silver medal at the 1994 Asian Games and then took his first title 1997 East Asian Games. A silver medal at the 1998 Asian Championship was followed by a gold medal at the 1998 Asian Games. In global events, he finished eighth at the 1992 World Junior Championships, tenth at the 1997 World Championships and ninth at the 2000 Olympic Games.

He scored gold medals at both the 2001 Goodwill Games and the 2001 East Asian Games – setting a Games record at the latter event. After the 2001 World Championships, he proceeded by winning the 2002 Asian Championships and Asian Games as well as a silver medal at the 2002 World Cup and a bronze medal at the 2003 World Championships. That year he threw 84.86 metres, which was the longest hammer throw in over ten years, putting Murofushi fourth on the all-time performer's list. Among the favorites at the 2004 Summer Olympics, he eventually won the gold medal after the disqualification of Adrián Annus.

Murofushi had an undergraduate degree in physical education and completed his doctorate in 2007 at Chukyo University. Murofushi was accepted a faculty appointment at Chukyo University as associate professor of physical education in 2011. Murofushi joined Tokyo Medical and Dental University in 2014 and serving professor in physical education and director of sports science center.

In July 2006 he won the World Athletics Final and the World Cup. He finished sixth at the 2007 World Championships in Athletics, third at the 2007 World Athletics Final, and fifth at the 2008 Olympic Games. Two medalists, Vadim Devyatovskiy and Ivan Tsikhan, were first disqualified for failing the doping test, but won the appeal and had their medals reinstated.

At the 2009 Japanese Championships, Murofushi retained his national title, winning his fifteenth consecutive championships at the event. He increased his title total again the following year.

He made a world-leading throw of 80.99 m at the Rieti IAAF Grand Prix meeting which ranked him first place in the inaugural IAAF Hammer Throw Challenge. He remained ahead of second-placed Dilshod Nazarov at the end of the series, winning with a score of 238.52 (the combined total of his three best throws on the circuit).

In July 2011, the JOC (Japanese Olympic Committee) nominated Murofushi for the IOC Athletes' Commission, with the elections taking place at the 2012 Olympics. Although Murofushi collected more than enough votes to be elected, his candidacy was voided by the IOC (International Olympic Committee) due to inappropriate campaigning by the JOC during the Games.

In August of the year, Murofushi won the gold medal at the world championships, making him the oldest winner of the men's hammer world title. He also won the International Fair Play award at the same world championships.

He competed at the 2012 Summer Olympics, winning the bronze medal.

He was appointed as Sports Director for the Tokyo 2020 Olympic Games in June 2014.

Personal life
Koji Murofushi comes from a hammer throwing family, as his father Shigenobu Murofushi is a former Olympian and held the Japanese record for 23 years until his son broke it, and his sister, Yuka Murofushi, throws both hammer and discus. Murofushi's mother, Serafina Moritz (born 1950) is Hungarian origin Romanian. She was a javelin thrower for Romania, European Junior champion in 1968, and Romanian senior champion in 1970. She is now a glass painter, and lives in Toyota City, Aichi Prefecture. Thanks to his mother, Murofushi speaks Romanian.

Competition record

See also
List of Olympic medalists in athletics (men)
List of World Athletics Championships medalists (men)
List of 2004 Summer Olympics medal winners
List of 2012 Summer Olympics medal winners
Hammer throw at the Olympics
List of Mizuno sponsorships
List of Japanese people
List of hāfu people

References

External links

1974 births
Living people
People from Numazu, Shizuoka
Sportspeople from Shizuoka Prefecture
Japanese male hammer throwers
Olympic male hammer throwers
Olympic athletes of Japan
Olympic gold medalists for Japan
Olympic bronze medalists for Japan
Olympic gold medalists in athletics (track and field)
Olympic bronze medalists in athletics (track and field)
Athletes (track and field) at the 2000 Summer Olympics
Athletes (track and field) at the 2004 Summer Olympics
Athletes (track and field) at the 2008 Summer Olympics
Athletes (track and field) at the 2012 Summer Olympics
Medalists at the 2004 Summer Olympics
Medalists at the 2012 Summer Olympics
Asian Games gold medalists for Japan
Asian Games silver medalists for Japan
Asian Games gold medalists in athletics (track and field)
Asian Games medalists in athletics (track and field)
Athletes (track and field) at the 1994 Asian Games
Athletes (track and field) at the 1998 Asian Games
Athletes (track and field) at the 2002 Asian Games
Medalists at the 1994 Asian Games
Medalists at the 1998 Asian Games
Medalists at the 2002 Asian Games
Competitors at the 2001 Goodwill Games
Goodwill Games medalists in athletics
World Athletics Championships athletes for Japan
World Athletics Championships medalists
World Athletics Championships winners
Asian Athletics Championships winners
Japan Championships in Athletics winners
Japanese people of Romanian descent
Academic staff of Tokyo Medical and Dental University
Recipients of the Medal with Purple Ribbon
Goodwill Games gold medalists in athletics